Basel Adra (also Basil and also Al-Adra or Al-Adraa) is a Palestinian activist and journalist who in 2021 was falsely accused of framing the Israeli Defence Forces (IDF) and who in 2022 was beaten while filming the IDF demolishing a structure that he built.

Personal life 
Adra was born to father Nasser in At-Tuwani, Hebron Municipality, in the West Bank of Palestine.

He lives in Masafer Yatta, Hebron.

Career and activism 
Adra is an activist and a volunteer photographer for B'Tselem. He works as journalist for online publications +972 Magazine and Local Call.

In 2021, Adra was falsely accused of setting fire to a building in the Hebron Hills area of the West Bank, in order to frame the Israeli Defence Forces (IDF). On May 8, 2022, he was beaten by IDF forces while reporting on IDF soldiers dismantling a structure that he built.

References

External links 

 
 +972 Articles by Adra
 2021 Haaretz OpEd I Grew Up Watching Settlers Attacking My Palestinian Village. They're Getting Bolder

Year of birth missing (living people)
Living people
Palestinian journalists
Palestinian activists
Palestinian photographers
People from Hebron Governorate